Pomatoceros lamarckii is a species of tube-building annelid worms which is widespread in intertidal and sub-littoral zones around the United Kingdom and northern Europe. They are found attached to firm substrates, from rocks to animal shells to man made structures, and often are noted for their detrimental effect on shipping. It is closely related to, and often confused with, Pomatoceros triqueter.

Pomatoceros lamarckii has been the subject of a number of scientific investigations, due to its presence near sites of historic scientific study, relatively underived mode of development   and slowly evolving genetic complement. Recently this organism has been the subject of in depth transcriptomic investigation.

References

Polychaetes
Animals described in 1866
Taxa named by Jean Louis Armand de Quatrefages de Bréau